Al-Sultan Ahmed Shihaabuddine Sri Loka Adheehtha Mahaa Radun (Dhivehi: އައްސުލްޠާން އަޙްމަދު ޝިހާބުއްދީން ސިރީ ލޯކަ އާދީއްތަ މަހާރަދުން) was the Sultan of Maldives from 1341 to 1347. He succeeded his father to the throne and ruled until his deposition by his sister, Queen Khadijah. After his deposition he was banished to Haddhunmathi Atoll and was assassinated while he was there.

References

14th-century sultans of the Maldives
14th-century murdered monarchs